Shi Shilun (施世綸, 1659 – July 3, 1722), popularly known as Shi Gong (施公; "Lord Shi") or Qingtian (施青天; "Clear-Sky Shi"), was a much-praised Qing dynasty official during the Kangxi Emperor's reign. He was the son of general Shi Lang.

In popular culture
In the 19th century, fictionalized gong'an (crime fiction) stories featuring him as a central character appeared in the novel The Cases of Lord Shi. Subsequently, many operas also featured him as a central character.

Fictional television series featuring him as the central protagonist include:
 The Great Arbitrator, a 1983 Taiwanese TV series starring Tsui Hao-jan as Shi.
 The Strange Cases of Lord Shih, a 1997 Taiwanese TV series starring Liao Chun as Shi.
 A Pillow Case of Mystery, a 2006 Hong Kong TV series starring Bobby Au-yeung as Shi.
 A Pillow Case of Mystery II (施公奇案II), a 2010 Hong Kong TV series again starring Au-yeung.
 Chinese Sherlock Shi, a 2013 Chinese TV series starring Fan Ming as Shi.

In addition, the 1987 Chinese martial arts film Golden Dart Hero is also based on some stories from The Cases of Lord Shi, although the film portrays Shi Shilun in a negative light.

References
 Shi Gong - cultural-china.com
 

1659 births
1722 deaths
Qing dynasty politicians from Fujian
Gong'an fiction
People from Jinjiang, Fujian
Politicians from Quanzhou
Han Chinese Bordered Yellow Bannermen